Levinger is a Jewish surname that may be derived from the name Levi. It may refer to:

Beryl Levinger (born 1947), American educator
Lowell Levinger (born 1946), American musician
Matthew Levinger (born 1960), American historian 
Moshe Levinger (1935–2015), Israeli rabbi

See also
Levanger (disambiguation)
Loevinger

Jewish surnames